The Nottingham Caesars are an American football team based in Nottingham, Nottinghamshire, England, who operate in the BAFA National Leagues NFC South 1, the second level of British American football. They are based at the Harvey Hadden Stadium in the Bilborough area of the city. The team is affectionately known by its players and fans as "The Big C" and was formed in 1984 initially as the youth team of the Nottingham Hoods before later splitting off to form its own adult side.

The club played in the BAFA Premier North in both the 2013 and 2014 seasons before being placed in the second tier of British American Football following a reshuffle of the League structure. They hold four Divisional titles to their name having won their division in 1995, 1997, 2003 and 2008. The club reached two Division 1 bowl games in both 1997 and 2003, both ending in defeat.

History

The Caesars began play in 1992, in competition with the cross-town Nottingham Hoods. The Hoods saw some success including a conference championship in 1992 under the leadership of import players Mike Grossner and Vic Quirolo. The Hoods stopped play in 1994, and this boosted the Caesars considerably, who then posted an undefeated 10–0 record in 1995. Since then, the Caesars have seen moderate success, with 3 conference championships including a trip to the Britbowl in 1997, ending in defeat to the Redbridge Fire 26–7.

Although the team lost out to the Tamworth Phoenix in the 2008 semi-finals, due to the league reshuffle the team earned promotion and in 2008 played in the BAFL 1 South West Conference. The Caesars struggled in 2009 picking up just two wins, 2010 was even less successful with their only win coming at home to the South Wales Warriors on the last day of the season, however this was enough to keep them in Division 1.

In 2012, the Caesars had a good season with an influx of Rookies joining already established players the "Big C" finished with a 7–3 record and made the playoffs. Unfortunately, the Caesars fell at the quarter-final stage away to the Berkshire Renegades.

In 2013, the Caesars were moved into the National Premier Division and it was a season of transition and adjustment to a higher standard of football. The Caesars finished the season with a 1–9 record. In 2014, the Caesars continued in the National Premier Division and made strides forward providing greater competition against Premiership opponents and making a name for themselves as fierce competitors

In 2015, the Caesars played in the Northern Football Conference and finished with a record of 4 wins, 5 losses and a tie. 2016 season brought a successful season with the club making the playoffs in the newly formed MFC 1. With wins against Peterborough Saxons, Ouse Valley Eagles, Doncaster Mustangs and the Birmingham Bulls they finished the year with a 6–4 record and were eventually beaten in a closely fought game against the Edinburgh Wolves.

2020 Saw a huge Overhaul coming on Offense with new Coordinator, Grant Lawless, bringing in several coaches with him.  The season was cancelled though due to COVID-19.  However, a good pre season and solid showing against the Hertfordshire Cheetahs in a scrimmage will be a good platform to build upon for 2021

Stadium
The Nottingham Caesars play their home games at the Harvey Hadden Stadium in Bilborough. The club have been based at the Stadium since the 1980s except a one-year stay at Devon Park, Newark in 1996.

Coaching staff

Roster

Team records

Playoffs

Junior Team 

The Nottingham Caesars also field a Junior team in the U19 competition.

Playoffs

References

External links
 Nottingham Caesars official club website

BAFA National League teams
American football teams established in 1984
Sport in Nottingham
American football teams in England
1984 establishments in England